is a passenger railway station located in the city of Omitama, Ibaraki Prefecture, Japan operated by the East Japan Railway Company (JR East).

Lines
Hatori Station is served by the Jōban Line, and is located 86.5 km from the official starting point of the line at Nippori Station. Two local trains stop approximately every hour during the day.

Station layout
The station has one side platform and one island platform, connected to the station building by a footbridge. The station is staffed.

Platforms

History
Hatori Station was opened on 1 December 1895. The station was absorbed into the JR East network upon the privatization of the Japanese National Railways (JNR) on 1 April 1987.

Passenger statistics
In fiscal 2019, the station was used by an average of 2290 passengers daily (boarding passengers only).

Surrounding area
 Japan National Route 355
Hatori Post Office

See also
 List of railway stations in Japan

References

External links

  Station information JR East Station Information 

Railway stations in Ibaraki Prefecture
Jōban Line
Railway stations in Japan opened in 1895
Omitama